Angela Raubal may refer to:

 Angela Hitler, married name Angela Raubal, (1883 − 1949), half-sister of Adolf Hitler
 Geli Raubal, full name Angela Raubal, (1908 − 1931), daughter of Leo and Angela (Hitler) Raubal and possible lover of her mother's half brother, Adolf Hitler